The Cathedral of Our Lady of the Rosary, also known simply as the Cathedral of Our Lady, is a Catholic cathedral located in Duluth, Minnesota, United States.  It is the seat of the Diocese of Duluth.  The present Italianate cathedral was completed in 1957 and replaced the former Sacred Heart Cathedral, which is now a music center.

See also
List of Catholic cathedrals in the United States
List of cathedrals in the United States

References

External links

Cathedral website 
Diocese of Duluth website

Christian organizations established in 1923
Roman Catholic churches completed in 1957
Our Lady of the Rosary
Churches in the Roman Catholic Diocese of Duluth
Churches in Duluth, Minnesota
Italianate architecture in Minnesota
20th-century Roman Catholic church buildings in the United States
Italianate church buildings in the United States